The following is a list of people executed by the U.S. state of Alabama since 1983. All of the 70 people (69 men and 1 woman) have been executed at the Holman Correctional Facility, near Atmore, Alabama. All executions since December 2002 have been by lethal injection. In 2021, the Alabama Department of Corrections announced it had constructed a facility at Holman to carry out executions by means of nitrogen hypoxia.

Prior to 1983, an 18-year moratorium on executions was observed under the direction of the Supreme Court of the United States. Alabama previously executed 153 people between 1927 and 1965.

See also 
 Capital punishment in Alabama
 Capital punishment in the United States

Notes 


References

External links 

 List of Alabama's executions since 1927 (Alabama Department of Corrections)
 Alabama inmates currently on death row (Alabama Department of Corrections)

Alabama
 
Executions